G. Erle Ingram (April 1, 1883 – after January 1946) was a member of the Wisconsin State Assembly and the Wisconsin State Senate.

He was born Gilbert Erle Ingram on April 1, 1883 in Eau Galle, Dunn County, Wisconsin. He attended the University of Wisconsin-Whitewater, the University of Wisconsin-La Crosse and Valparaiso University.

Career
From 1928 to 1929, Ingram was a member of the Republican State Central Committee. He was then a member of the Assembly from 1931 to 1932 and of the Senate from 1933 to 1940.

References

People from Dunn County, Wisconsin
Republican Party Wisconsin state senators
Republican Party members of the Wisconsin State Assembly
University of Wisconsin–Whitewater alumni
University of Wisconsin–La Crosse alumni
Valparaiso University alumni
1883 births
Year of death missing